Outland is an Australian television comedy series which screened in 2012 on ABC1. The six-part comedy series was written by John Richards (episodes 1 - 6) and Adam Richard (episodes 1 - 3). It is based on the 2006 short film of the same name.

The first public screening of Outland took place at the science fiction convention Continuum 7, where brief clips of episodes 1 and 4 were shown, on 12 June 2011. The full series was played over two nights at the 16th Seattle Lesbian & Gay Film Festival, on 18 and 19 October 2011, where it won an audience award. The series was also screened at the 3rd annual Bent-Con convention in Burbank, California on 2 December 2012.

The first episode screened on Australian television on 8 February 2012, at 9.30pm. In New Zealand, it screened in February–March 2014 on digital channel Choice TV.

Overview
Outland revolves around the lives, loves and never-ending dramas of the members of a gay science-fiction fan club.

Cast
 Christine Anu as Rae
 Ben Gerrard as Toby
 Paul Ireland as Andy
 Adam Richard as Fab
 Toby Truslove as Max

Social media
Outside of the show itself, the character of Fab had a Twitter feed (@FabXXL) and Adam Richard had a blog in character as Fab, where he talked about what happened in the week's episode and reviewed a science fiction film. Writer John Richards has online commentary tracks that can be synced up to each episode.

Episodes

References

External links
 

Australian comedy television series
2012 Australian television series debuts
2012 Australian television series endings
Australian Broadcasting Corporation original programming
Australian LGBT-related television shows
English-language television shows